The 1981 Virginia Tech Hokies football team was an American football team that represented Virginia Tech as an independent during the 1981 NCAA Division I-A football season. In their fourth year under head coach Bill Dooley, the Hokies compiled an overall record of 7–4.

Schedule

Roster

References

Virginia Tech
Virginia Tech Hokies football seasons
Virginia Tech Hokies football